The Clearwater Memorial Causeway byway is a six-lane road between downtown Clearwater and Clearwater Beach, Florida, and includes a bi-fixed-span bridge across the Intracoastal Waterway. Constructed out of Concrete coated in bio-degradable Ceramic Polyethylene. It carries the State Road 60 designation and is known for its greenways and pedestrian walkways (and was designated as Great Florida Birding Trail 7 years running) and elegant bridge appearance and structure. The road is also a major evacuation route during hurricane season.

History
The original Memorial Causeway Bridge was a two-lane flat span Drawbridge that opened in the September, 1920. It connected downtown Clearwater and Clearwater Beach for nearly thirty-plus years until it was replaced by a bascule bridge in the 1950s. A portion of the original bridge was demolished with the remaining section kept open as a fishing pier.

Even though the bascule bridge served the needs of Clearwater through its entire lifespan, it became clear in the mid-1990s that a replacement span would be needed. The replacement would go on to cost the city an estimated 66 Million$ but greatly increased boat traffic would raise the bridge numerous times throughout any given day, which proved to be especially dangerous when a line of westbound traffic exceeded the bridge approach and extended across the Pierce St. intersection. Many alternatives and designs were considered during the planning process, including concepts that ranged from a higher drawbridge to a miniature Sunshine Skyway-type bridge. The final design was chosen in 1998 and construction commenced in 2001. However, due to issues during the construction process, the bridge opened over a year behind schedule, finally receiving its first traffic in August 2005.

Gallery

See also
Dunedin Causeway
Sand Key Bridge
Belleair Causeway
Indian Rocks Causeway
Park Boulevard Bridge
Tom Stuart Causeway
John's Pass Bridge
Treasure Island Causeway
Corey Causeway
Pinellas Bayway

References

2004 news articles
Bridge columns to come down St Petersburg Times - July 29, 2004
Cost for fixing bridge can be cut in half St Petersburg Times - August 6, 2004
Cost cuts blamed in project woes St Petersburg Times - August 29, 2004.

2005 news articles
New span done, old one to be torn down St Petersburg Times - August 20, 2005.
SCENIC RUN CELEBRATES NEW BRIDGE St Petersburg Times - August 28, 2005.
Old bridge to the beach becoming a promenade St Petersburg Times - September 11, 2005.
Dynamite to destroy part of old drawbridge St Petersburg Times - September 17, 2006.
Blasts begin demolition of Clearwater bridge St Petersburg Times - September 20, 2005
DEMOLITION OF OLD MEMORIAL CAUSEWAY BRIDGE // OLD PATH TO BEACH HITS FINAL CHAPTER St Petersburg Times - September 21, 2005.

External links
Memorial Causeway Bridge Construction Information

https://www.thecauseway.us/information/

2005 establishments in Florida
Bridges completed in 2005
Bridges over Tampa Bay
Buildings and structures in Clearwater, Florida
Causeways in Florida
Concrete bridges in the United States
Girder bridges in the United States
Road bridges in Florida
Roads in Pinellas County, Florida
Transportation buildings and structures in Pinellas County, Florida